Yohan Kende (born March 3, 1949) is an Israeli former Olympic swimmer. He was born in Timișoara, Romania.

Swimming career
Kende competed for Israel at the 1968 Summer Olympics in Mexico City, Mexico, in swimming at the age of 19. He swam in the Men's 100 metre Breaststroke and came in 6th in Heat 4 with a time of 1:12.3, and in the Men's 200 metre Breaststroke and came in 8th in Heat 4 with a time of 2:44.3.

References

External links
 

Sportspeople from Timișoara
1949 births
Israeli male swimmers
Living people
Swimmers at the 1968 Summer Olympics
Olympic swimmers of Israel
Asian Games medalists in swimming
Asian Games bronze medalists for Israel
Swimmers at the 1970 Asian Games
Medalists at the 1970 Asian Games